The Battle of Turret Peak occurred March 27, 1873 in the Arizona Territory between the United States Army and a group of Yavapai and Tonto Apaches as part of Lieutenant Colonel George Crook's campaign to return the natives to reservations.

Background 
In June 1871, George Crook was assigned to the Southwest to help quell skirmishes between settlers and members of the Yavapai and Apache tribes in central Arizona Territory. He organized the Tonto Basin Campaign to track down members of the tribes and return them to the reservations. Over the course of the operation, there were over twenty clashes, including a highly successful attack in December 1872 on a Yavapai camp during the Battle of Salt River Canyon that ended with seventy-six dead natives. On March 11, 1873, a band of Tonto Apaches attacked and killed three white men. Crook's men tracked the attackers to a Yavapai stronghold on Turret Peak in central Arizona.

Battle
On March 27, 1873, a group of soldiers and Apache Scouts under the command of Captain George M. Randall crept up Turret Peak around midnight. Randall had the men crawl on hands and knees to avoid making any noise or rattling any stones.  Waiting until dawn, the soldiers charged and surprised a rancheria near the crest of the mountain. The natives were so startled and panic-stricken that many of them simply jumped from the mountain side falling to their death below. Some resisted, fighting for a little while before being killed or surrendering. Fifty-seven natives died as result and several more were wounded and captured. Unfortunately a few civilians were found in the cave after the fighting had stopped, killed accidentally by the covering fire or rolling rocks. The attack at Turret Peak proved demoralizing to the Yavapai and Tonto (Apache) people. Two weeks after the battle, on April 6, many of the hostiles surrendered to Crook at Camp Verde. Several of the soldiers who fought at Turret Peak were later awarded the Medal of Honor for their actions.

References 
 

  
 
 

Turret Peak
Battle of Turret Peak
Apache Wars
Turret Peak
Turret Peak
Battle of Turret Peak
History of United States expansionism
19th-century military history of the United States
Battle of Turret Peak
March 1873 events